WRAL may refer to:

 WRAL-TV, a television station (channel 17, virtual 5) licensed to Raleigh, North Carolina
 WRAL (FM), a radio station (101.5 FM) licensed to Raleigh, North Carolina
 WPJL, a radio station (1240 AM) licensed to Raleigh, North Carolina, and once called WRAL